The men's 400 metres was a track and field athletics event held as part of the Athletics at the 1912 Summer Olympics programme. The competition was held on Friday, July 12, 1912, and on Saturday, July 13, 1912. Forty-nine runners from 16 nations competed. NOCs could enter up to 12 athletes. The event was won by Charles Reidpath of the United States, the nation's fourth title in the event. Hanns Braun of Germany took silver, the nation's first medal in the men's 400 metres.

Background

It was the fifth appearance of the event, which is one of 12 athletics events to have been held at every Summer Olympics. None of the finalists from 1908 returned. The favorites were all among by the American team: 1909 and 1911 AAU champion Edward Lindberg, 1911 IC4A champion Donnell Young, and 1912 IC4A champion Charles Reidpath.

Australasia, Austria, Bohemia, Japan, Portugal, Russia, and South Africa appeared in the event for the first time. The United States made its fifth appearance in the event, the only nation to compete in it at every Olympic Games to that point.

Competition format

The competition consisted of three rounds. The first round had 15 heats, ranging from 1 to 6 runners. The top two runners in each heat advanced to the semifinals. The semifinal was to consist of 5 heats of 6 runners each, but one semifinal had only 5 runners because one preliminary heat had only had 1 runner. Only the top runner in each semifinal heat advanced, making a five-man final. The first two rounds were run without lanes, but an incident in the last semifinal resulted in the final being held with strings demarking lanes.

Records

These were the standing world and Olympic records (in seconds) prior to the 1912 Summer Olympics.

(*) unofficial 440 yards (= 402.34 m)

(**) This track was 536.45 metres= mile in circumference.

The Olympic record of 48.4 seconds, set at the previous Olympics, fell in the final. Charles Reidpath broke the record with a 48.2 second performance. Reidpath's time was ratified by the IAAF as the inaugural official world record. Hanns Braun also broke the old Olympic record and Edward Lindberg tied it, en route to silver and bronze medals, respectively.

Schedule

Results

Heats

All heats were held on Friday, July 12, 1912.

Heat 1

Heat 2

Heat 3

Heat 4

Heat 5

Heat 6

Heat 7

Heat 8

Heat 9

Heat 10

Heat 11

Heat 12

Heat 13

Heat 14

Heat 15

Semifinals

All semi-finals were held on Friday, July 12, 1912.

Semifinal 1

Semifinal 2

Semifinal 3

Semifinal 4

Semifinal 5

Young crossed the finish line in first, but was disqualified for elbowing Braun and knocking him to the outside of the track as Braun tried to cut in front of him. This incident resulted in lanes being used for the final the next day.

Final

The final was held on Saturday, July 13, 1912. It was held in lanes because of the incident between Young and Braun in the semifinals. There were three false starts before the race finally started legally. Meredith led early with a strong pace. Braun took the lead around the halfway mark. Reidpath finished strong, passing Braun in the final 15 metres.

Reidpath's time broke the Olympic record; it was also recognized as the inaugural world record in the event at the formation of World Athletics (then known as the IAAF).

References

External links
 
 

Men's 0400 metres
400 metres at the Olympics